Nieva District is one of three districts of the province Condorcanqui in Peru.

References

1984 establishments in Peru
Districts of the Condorcanqui Province
Districts of the Amazonas Region